John Trimble may refer to:
 John Trimble (theologian)
 John Trimble (politician)
 John M. Trimble, American builder and theater architect